Kathryn Adams (born Kathryn Ethalinda Colson; May 25, 1893 – February 17, 1959), sometimes credited as  Catherine Adams or Katherine Adams, was an American silent film actress.

Early years
Adams was born Kathryn Ethalinda Colson on May 25, 1893, the daughter of actress Kate Colson. She was educated in St. Louis, and had vocal training in New York.

Career 
Early in her career, Adams "played in numerous types of legitimate drama". She entered films in 1915 after a brief and rather unsuccessful stint in musical comedy.

Adams worked for the Thanhouser Company in its early films and had the lead roles in that company's productions The Bird of Prey and The Phantom Witness. After a number of successful leading roles, she drifted into supporting roles in the 1920s, and, except for a brief appearance in the 1931 version of The Squaw Man, Adams disappeared from films after 1925. She retired from the film industry in 1931 and worked as an assembler at Lockheed Corporation making aircraft.

Personal life and death 
Adams married Arthur Witter in 1920; in 1928, the two divorced due to Witter's drinking. She later married Jacques Magnin, a businessman from Los Angeles.

On February 17, 1959, Adams died in Hollywood Presbyterian Hospital of an intestinal hemorrhage at the age of 65. She is buried in section R of Calvary Cemetery, East Los Angeles next to her mother.

Filmography

 The Shooting of Dan McGrew (1915)
 After Dark (1915)
 The Pursuing Shadow (1915)
 Helene of the North (1915)
 The Long Arm of the Secret Service (1915)
 In Baby's Garden (1915)
 Her Confession (1915)
 An Innocent Traitor (1915)
 Bubbles in the Glass (1916)
 The Phantom Witness (1916)
 A Bird of Prey (1916)
 The Romance of the Hollow Tree (1916)
 For Uncle Sam's Navy (1916)
 Other People's Money (1916)
 The Shine Girl (1916)
 Divorce and the Daughter (1916)
 The Vicar of Wakefield (1917)
 Pots-and-Pans Peggy (1917)
 The Woman and the Beast (1917)
 The Valentine Girl (1917)
 Hinton's Double (1917)
 The Streets of Illusion (1917)
 The Customary Two Weeks (1917)
 Baby Mine (1917, credited as Katherine Adams)
 Raffles The Amateur Cracksman (1917)
 True Blue (1918)
 Riders of the Purple Sage (1918)
 Restless Souls (1919, credited as Katherine Adams)
 A Gentleman of Quality (1919)
 The Silver Girl (1919, credited as Catherine Adams)
  A Rogue's Romance (1919, credited as Katherine Adams)
 Cowardice Court (1919)
 A Little Brother of the Rich (1919)
 The Brute Breaker (1919)
 Uncharted Channels (1920)
 The Forbidden Woman (1920)
 The Best of Luck  (1920)
 Big Happiness (1920)
 813 (1920)
 The Silver Car (1921)
 The Man from Downing Street (1922)
 Borrowed Husbands (1924)
 Pampered Youth (1925)
 The Squaw Man'' (Uncredited, 1931)

References

External links

American silent film actresses
1893 births
1959 deaths
Actresses from St. Louis
20th-century American actresses
Burials at Calvary Cemetery (Los Angeles)